Interior of the Nieuwe Kerk, Amsterdam is a 1657 oil painting on canvas by Emanuel de Witte.

References

1657 paintings
Paintings in the collection of the Timken Museum of Art